Into The Fight is a professional wrestling event promoted by CyberFight for their DDT Pro-Wrestling (DDT) brand. The event has been held annually since 2005 (except in 2006 and 2022), airing domestically on Fighting TV Samurai and later as an internet pay-per-view (iPPV) on CyberFight's streaming service Wrestle Universe. The event is usually held around February.

Events

References

External links
The official DDT Pro-Wrestling website

 
DDT Pro-Wrestling shows